State Route 194 (SR 194) is a numbered state highway in the U.S. state of Maine. The route runs  from an intersection with SR 27 in Pittston to an intersection with SR 215 in North Newcastle, a village of Newcastle. The state route has one major junction with SR 218 in the town of Whitefield.

History
SR 194 was designated in 1925 and originally ran from New England Interstate Route 24 (now U.S. Route 1) in Easton, a town in Aroostook County, and the Canadian border. In the 1930s, SR 194 was decommissioned, and the border crossing became one of the few in Maine to not have an assigned route number. After the original route was decommissioned, SR 194 was assigned to a short  road located entirely in the town of Rockport. In 1948, SR 194 was decommissioned again when the road was designated part of the new SR 90. SR 194 was assigned to its current alignment in 1951.

Junction list

References

External links

194
Transportation in Kennebec County, Maine
Transportation in Lincoln County, Maine